Jaypee James de Guzman (born April 20, 1978) is a multi-awarded actor in the Philippines. He was a famous child star of the '80s along with Bamba, Lady Lee, RR Herrera, Chuckie Dreyfus, Glaiza Herradura, Rose Ann Gonzales, Matet de Leon and Aiza Seguerra, among others. He received his first award as the Best Child Performer in the Metro Manila Film Festival movie Teng Teng De Sarapen (1983) starring Dolphy and Alma Moreno.

Career
At the age of four, de Guzman made his feature film debut in Maryo J. de los Reyes' Saan Darating ang Umaga? (1983), a family drama in which he portrayed the adopted son of Nida Blanca and Nestor de Villa and a target of his sister Maricel Soriano. He also appeared in other notable films, such as Teng Teng de Serapen (1983), Mga Batang Yagit (1984), Dear Mama (1984), Kapag Puso’y Sinugatan (1984), and Tinik Sa Dibdib (1985), where he played the role of a mentally-challenged child. Throughout his acting career, de Guzman received two nominations and won twice for Best Child Actor (Saan Darating Ang Umaga? and Tinik sa Dibdib) at the FAMAS Awards. Additionally, he was named the Best Child Performer for the comedy film Teng Teng de Sarapen at the Metro Manila Film Festival in 1983.

In 1989, de Guzman joined the youth-oriented program That's Entertainment and became a regular member ever since, before the show ended seven years later. He guested in one of the episodes of Homeboy with other former child stars RR Herrera and Chuckie Dreyfus.

In 2014, de Guzman returned from his nearly two-decade showbiz absence to star in the GMA evening soap series My BFF, portraying the best friend and sidekick of Janno Gibbs' character.

Personal life
De Guzman graduated Communication Arts from De La Salle University in 2000. A family man, de Guzman is married to former television host PY Nakar since 2007 and has three boys, namely Mateo, Lucas, and Zach.

De Guzman worked as an editor at GMA 7, directing several music videos and handling post-production services for the network's defunct sister channel QTV.

A devout and charismatic Catholic, de Guzman serves as the head of the music and audiovisual arm and the national coordinator for the youth ministry at Elim Communities in New Manila, Quezon City. Apart from his regular services in the Church, de Guzman also manages the video department at Springs Foundation, Inc., a nonprofit organization dedicated to the proclamation of Gospel through integral evangelization. Because cycling is one of his favorite hobbies, de Guzman owns the Trinity Cycle Shop.

Filmography

Film

Television

Accolades

References

External links

1978 births
Living people
Filipino male child actors
That's Entertainment Friday Group Members
That's Entertainment (Philippine TV series)
De La Salle University alumni